"Twenty Seven Million" is a song released by English Christian worship leader, songwriter and author Matt Redman and English Christian electronic dance music group LZ7. The song was released in the United Kingdom as a digital download on 27 February 2012.

Background
Matt Redman & LZ7 released the song on 27 February 2012 intending to raise awareness for the anti-human trafficking movement. The record is in support of the A21 Campaign, and the aim to abolish modern day slavery. Redman said: "It's a huge issue in our world that's rising to the surface. Governments, police and the media are all talking about it, and the church is doing a lot of stuff - this is a song to recognise that and hopefully drive some more awareness. Let's propel this somewhere good together, make some noise about this issue that is on the heart of God and the heart of the Church."

Track listing
 Digital download
 "Twenty Seven Million" - 4:16

Charts

Release history

References

2011 songs
2012 singles
LZ7 songs